Scardamia is a genus of moths in the family Geometridae.

Description
Palpi smoothly scaled and not reaching beyond the frons. Antennae of male bipectinated. Hind tibia not dilated. Forewings with vein 3 from before angle of cell. Veins 7 to 9 stalked from before upper angle and veins 10 and 11 stalked, anastomosing with vein 12. Hindwings with vein 3 from before angle of cell and vein 7 from before upper angle.

Species
Scardamia aurantiacaria Bremer, 1864
Scardamia bractearia (Walker, 1860)
Scardamia chrysolina Meyrick, 1892 (Australia)
Scardamia iographa Prout, 1932 (Borneo, Malaysia)
Scardamia ithyzona Turner, 1919 (Australia)
Scardamia maculata Warren, 1897 ( Central & E.Africa, Madagascar)
Scardamia metallaria Guenée, 1858 (India, S.E.Asia, Australia)
Scardamia nubilicosta L. B. Prout, 1932 (Congo, Nigeria)
Scardamia obliquaria Leech, 1897
Scardamian seminigra Prout, 1925
Scardamia xylosmaria Sato, C.M. Fu & Kawakami, 2011 (Japan)

References

 

Ourapterygini